Walter A. Czekaj (April 21, 1936 – October 13, 2008) was an American football coach.  He served as the interim head football coach at Sacred Heart University for the final five games of the 1999 season following the firing of Tom Radulski.

Czekaj was born on April 21, 1936, in New York City.  He died on October 13, 2008, at The Connecticut Hospice in Branford, Connecticut, after having suffered a stroke earlier that month.

Head coaching record

College

Notes

References

1936 births
2008 deaths
American football linebackers
American football quarterbacks
Bridgeport Purple Knights football players
Sacred Heart Pioneers football coaches
High school football coaches in Connecticut
Junior college football coaches in the United States
Sportspeople from New York City
People from Stratford, Connecticut
Players of American football from Connecticut